Pogorzel may refer to the following places:
Pogorzel, Mińsk County in Masovian Voivodeship (east-central Poland)
Pogorzel, Mława County in Masovian Voivodeship (east-central Poland)
Pogorzel, Gmina Celestynów in Masovian Voivodeship (east-central Poland)
Pogorzel, Gmina Osieck in Masovian Voivodeship (east-central Poland)
Pogorzel, Sokołów County in Masovian Voivodeship (east-central Poland)
Pogorzel, Warmian-Masurian Voivodeship (north Poland)